Montorio Romano is a  (municipality) in the Metropolitan City of Rome in the Italian region of Latium, located about  northeast of Rome.

Montorio Romano borders the following municipalities: Monteflavio, Montelibretti, Moricone, Nerola, Scandriglia.

References

Cities and towns in Lazio